People's Artist of the Armenian SSR (Народный артист Армянской ССР), is an honorary title awarded to citizens of the Armenian SSR in the Soviet Union. It is awarded for outstanding performance in the performing arts, whose merits are exceptional in the sphere of the development of the performing arts (theatre, music, dance, circus, cinema, etc.).

List of recipients (partial list) 
 Alexander Arutiunian
 Tigran Levonyan
 Hovhannes Abelian
 Djivan Gasparyan
 Khoren Abrahamyan
 Henrik Malyan
 Svetlana Navasardyan
 Konstantin Orbelyan
 Aram Khachaturian
 Frunzik Mkrtchyan
 Vladimir Kocharyan

See also 
People's Artist of the USSR

References

External links

People's Artists
Armenian Soviet Socialist Republic
Honorary titles of the Soviet Union